In ancient Greek religion and mythology, Euphrosyne, was a deity, one of the Charites, known in ancient Rome as the Gratiae (Graces). She was sometimes called Euthymia (Εὐθυμία) or Eutychia (Εὐτυχία).

Family 
According to Hesiod, Euphrosyne and her sisters Thalia and Aglaea were daughters of Zeus and the Oceanid Eurynome. Alternative parentage may be Zeus and Eurydome, Eurymedousa, or Euanthe; Dionysus and Kronois; or Helios and the Naiad Aegle.

In some accounts, Euphrosyne was a daughter of the primordial gods, Erebus (Darkness) and Nyx (Night)."From Nox/ Nyx (Night) and Erebus [were born]: Fatum/ Moros (Fate), Senectus/ Geras (Old Age), Mors/ Thanatos (Death), Letum (Dissolution), Continentia (Moderation), Somnus/ Hypnos (Sleep), Somnia/ Oneiroi (Dreams), Amor (Love)--that is Lysimeles, Epiphron (Prudence), Porphyrion, Epaphus, Discordia/ Eris (Discord), Miseria/ Oizys (Misery), Petulantia/ Hybris (Wantonness), Nemesis (Envy), Euphrosyne (Good Cheer), Amicitia/ Philotes (Friendship), Misericordia/ Eleos (Compassion), Styx (Hatred); the three Parcae/ Moirai (Fates), namely Clotho, Lachesis and Atropos; the Hesperides."

Mythology
Euphrosyne is a goddess of good cheer, joy and mirth. Her name is the female version of the word euphrosynos, "merriment". Pindar wrote that these goddesses were created to fill the world with pleasant moments and good will. The Charites attended the goddess of beauty Aphrodite.

In art, Euphrosyne is usually depicted with her sisters dancing.

Cults
Euphrosyne and her sisters' main cult was located in Athens, Sparta, or Boetia.

Legacy

In art and literature

 Euphrosyne is depicted with the other two Graces, Aglaea and Thalia, at the left of the painting in Botticelli's Primavera. The sculptor Antonio Canova made a well-known piece in white marble representing the three Graces, in several copies including one for John Russell, 6th Duke of Bedford.
 Joshua Reynolds painted Mrs. Mary Hale, wife of General John Hale, as Euphrosyne in 1766.
 John Milton invoked her in the poem L'Allegro.
 Virginia Woolf set her novel The Voyage Out on a ship named Euphrosyne.

In science
 The asteroid 31 Euphrosyne is named after the goddess, as is the Euphrosinidae family of marine worms.
 Augustin Pyramus de Candolle named a genus of plants in the family Asteraceae Euphrosyne.

Notes

References 

 Hesiod, Theogony from The Homeric Hymns and Homerica with an English Translation by Hugh G. Evelyn-White, Cambridge, MA., Harvard University Press; London, William Heinemann Ltd. 1914. Online version at the Perseus Digital Library. Greek text available from the same website.
 Nonnus of Panopolis, Dionysiaca translated by William Henry Denham Rouse (1863-1950), from the Loeb Classical Library, Cambridge, MA, Harvard University Press, 1940.  Online version at the Topos Text Project.
 Nonnus of Panopolis, Dionysiaca. 3 Vols. W.H.D. Rouse. Cambridge, MA., Harvard University Press; London, William Heinemann, Ltd. 1940-1942. Greek text available at the Perseus Digital Library.
 Pausanias, Description of Greece with an English Translation by W.H.S. Jones, Litt.D., and H.A. Ormerod, M.A., in 4 Volumes. Cambridge, MA, Harvard University Press; London, William Heinemann Ltd. 1918. . Online version at the Perseus Digital Library
 Pausanias, Graeciae Descriptio. 3 vols. Leipzig, Teubner. 1903.  Greek text available at the Perseus Digital Library.
 Pindar, Odes translated by Diane Arnson Svarlien. 1990. Online version at the Perseus Digital Library.
 Pindar, The Odes of Pindar including the Principal Fragments with an Introduction and an English Translation by Sir John Sandys, Litt.D., FBA. Cambridge, MA., Harvard University Press; London, William Heinemann Ltd. 1937. Greek text available at the Perseus Digital Library.
 The Homeric Hymns and Homerica with an English Translation by Hugh G. Evelyn-White. Homeric Hymns. Cambridge, MA., Harvard University Press; London, William Heinemann Ltd. 1914. Online version at the Perseus Digital Library. Greek text available from the same website.

Greek goddesses
Children of Nyx
Children of Zeus
Children of Helios
Children of Dionysus
Happiness